Zarya Komunny is a rural locality (a selo) in Vperedovsky Selsoviet, Kizlyarsky District, Republic of Dagestan, Russia. The population was 880 as of 2010. There are 9 streets.

Geography 
Zarya Komunny is located 6 km north of Kizlyar (the district's administrative centre) by road. Novoye and Vperyod are the nearest rural localities.

Nationalities 
Avars and Russians live there.

References 

Rural localities in Kizlyarsky District